Tranquilino Luna (February 25, 1849 – November 20, 1892) was a Delegate to the United States House of Representatives from the Territory of New Mexico. Born in Los Lunas, New Mexico, Luna attended the public schools and graduated from the University of Missouri in Columbia, Missouri. He engaged extensively in stock raising.

Luna served as delegate to the Republican National Conventions in 1880 and 1888. Luna was elected as a Republican to the Forty-seventh Congress (March 4, 1881 – March 3, 1883). He presented credentials as a Delegate-elect to the Forty-eighth Congress and served from March 4, 1883, until March 5, 1884, when he was succeeded by Francisco A. Manzanares, who contested his election. After leaving Congress, he was the Sheriff of Valencia County, New Mexico, from 1888-1892. He died in Peralta, New Mexico, on November 20, 1892, and was buried in Los Lunas Cemetery in Los Lunas, New Mexico.

See also
 List of Hispanic Americans in the United States Congress

Sources

1849 births
1892 deaths
Delegates to the United States House of Representatives from New Mexico Territory
New Mexico sheriffs
University of Missouri alumni
American politicians of Mexican descent
Neomexicanos
Hispanic and Latino American members of the United States Congress
New Mexico Republicans
19th-century American politicians
People from Los Lunas, New Mexico